Widmann is a German surname. Notable people with the surname include:

Albert Widmann (1912–1986), German chemist and SS officer who worked for the Action T4 program of Nazi Germany
Carolin Widmann (born 1976), German violinist, sister of Jörg Widmann
Erasmus Widmann (1572–1634), South German composer
Frederick Widmann (1859–1925), German-born American architect and philanthropist
Horst Widmann (born 1938), Austrian painter
Johannes Widmann (1460–1498), German mathematician, invented the addition (+) and the subtraction (-) signs
Jörg Widmann (born 1973), German composer and clarinetist, brother of Carolin Widmann
Rosina Widmann née Binder (1826–1908), German educator and missionary

See also
Dyckerhoff & Widmann (Dywidag), construction company based in Munich, Germany
Villa Widmann – Foscari, villa at the shores of the river Brenta between Venice and Padua
Widman, a Swedish surname
Weidemann
Weidmann
Wideman
Widemann
Wiedemann
Wittmann

Surnames from status names
German-language surnames